Cândido Motta Filho  (September 16, 1897 – February 4, 1977) was a Brazilian lawyer, professor, journalist, essayist and politician.

Early life
He was born in São Paulo, SP, on September 16, 1897, and died in Rio de Janeiro, RJ, on February 4, 1977. He was the son of Cândido Nanzianzeno Nogueira da Mota and Clara do Amaral Mota. His father was a lawyer and professor of Criminal Law at the Faculty of Law of São Paulo, and also a senior politician in the State of São Paulo.

Filho did his primary studies at Escola Modelo Modelo Caetano de Campos and Grupo Escolar do Arouche, and his secondary school at Colégio Santo Inácio, in Rio de Janeiro, and at Nogueira da Gama Gymnasium, in São Paulo. He entered the Faculty of Law of São Paulo where, in 1919, he earned a bachelor's degree in Legal and Social Sciences, dedicating himself to law, journalism, politics and teaching.

Journalism
He started his journalistic life at Correio Paulistano, as the head of the legal column and the literary page. He wrote for Comércio de São Paulo and, under the pseudonym of Paulo Queiroga, he appeared in the São Paulo Jornal, of which he was director from 1929 to 1930, when the newspaper was preoccupied with the revolutionary movement that deposed President Washington Luís. He was also editor-in-chief of Folha da Manhã and literary critic of the Diários Associados. He ran, with other writers, the magazines Klaxon and Politica. With Guilherme de Almeida, Menotti del Picchia, René Thiollier and Oswald de Andrade, he took part in the Modern Art Week, making a critical study of Modernism in the newspapers. Then, with Cassiano Ricardo and Menotti del Picchia, he promoted the Green-Yellow Movement, which sought to explore new directions for Brazilian literature. He stood against the excesses of naturalism in the novel and Parnassian formalism in poetry.

Politics
In politics, right after graduating in law, Cândido Mota Filho was elected a justice in the São Paulo neighborhood of Santa Cecília as an integral member of the Republican Party. After 1930, he founded, with Alcântara Machado, Abelardo César and Alarico Caiuby, the PRP National Action, with a program inspired by Alberto Torres. He was an official of the Secretary of Agriculture in the Altino Arantes government, in São Paulo and, in 1933, of the mayoralty of the São Paulo capital. He was also a state deputy for the Constitutionalist Party, being part of the Constituent Assembly of São Paulo.

He participated in the Constitutionalist Revolution, in the office of Governor Pedro de Toledo, along with Cassiano Ricardo and Menotti del Picchia. In 1934, with Antônio de Alcântara Machado, he joined the Technical Office of the São Paulo bench, destined to coordinate the data for the elaboration of the Federal Constitution. During the Estado Novo, he succeeded Cassiano Ricardo in the Press and Propaganda Department and, after the period of constitutional adaptation, he was chief of staff to Minister Honório Monteiro and, next, Minister of Labor of the Gaspar Dutra government. After the death of Getúlio Vargas, with the Café Filho government, he held the position of Minister of Education and Culture. He was national president of the Republican Party, succeeding Artur Bernardes.

Academic and legal positions
As a lawyer and professor, Cândido Mota Filho held numerous positions: lawyer for the State Agricultural Patronage; lawyer for the Municipality of São Paulo; teacher at Artur Mota Gymnasium and Ipiranga Gymnasium; professor of History, in the Pre-Legal Course at the Faculty of Law of São Paulo; of Philosophical Anthropology, in the course promoted by the university founded by Antônio Picarolo, professor of Criminal Law and full professor of Constitutional Law, at the Faculty of Law of São Paulo; Doctor Honoris Causa of the University of Porto Alegre and, finally, minister of the Supreme Federal Court, of which he was vice-president. He was also president of the Superior Electoral Court. In addition, Cândido Mota Filho was director of the São Paulo Minor Protection Service; president of the Brazilian Society of Psychology (1936); vice president of the Brazilian Philosophy Society; honorary president of the Brazil-Germany Cultural Institute; member of the Academia de Belas Artes and Academia Paulista de Letras, and president of the National Writers Association.

He was a member of the Brazilian Academy of Letters. He was the fourth occupant of Chair 5, to which he was elected on April 7, 1960, in succession to Aloísio de Castro, and received by academic Josué Montello on July 20, 1960. He, in turn, received academic Mário Palmério.

He was also a member of the Brazilian Lawyers' Institute; the Brazilian Historical and Geographic Institute; the Brazilian Writers Union; the Technical Council for Economics, Sociology, Politics and Finance of the Trade Federation of São Paulo, the Pen Clube do Brasil and São Paulo; Professor Honoris Causa of the University of Porto Alegre and Professor Emeritus of the Faculty of Law of the University of São Paulo.

Personal
He was married to D. Elza Lichtenfels Mota, and had five children: Nelson Cândido, Paulo, Cândido Geraldo, Flávio and Maria Teresa.

References

Brazilian writers
Brazilian journalists
20th-century Brazilian politicians
Academic staff of the University of São Paulo
20th-century Brazilian lawyers
1897 births
1977 deaths